The 2003–04 season was Birmingham City Football Club's 101st season in the English football league system, their second season in the Premier League, and their 52nd season in the top tier of English football. They finished 10th in the 20-team league, three places higher than the previous season. They entered the FA Cup at the third round stage and lost to Sunderland in the fifth after a replay, and lost their opening second-round League Cup-tie to Blackpool. Top scorer was loan signing Mikael Forssell with 19 goals, 17 of which were scored in the league.

Pre-season

Pre-season friendlies

Premier League

Season review
Having avoided relegation in their first season in the Premier League with seven wins from the last eleven games, Birmingham were expected to struggle. They were unbeaten in the league at the end of September, and went into November still in fourth place. During a poor spell in the middle of the season Steve Bruce's side fell as low as tenth, though they rallied again and stood one point off fourth place with eight matches to go. In contrast to the previous season, just one win from the last eleven games gave Birmingham a tenth-place finish, six points behind city rivals Aston Villa, who had been struggling against relegation at the turn of the year.

August–September
In Birmingham's first game of the season, they beat Tottenham Hotspur 1–0 at St Andrew's, courtesy of a debut goal by record signing David Dunn, who converted a penalty awarded for Anthony Gardner's foul on Robbie Savage. Tottenham's manager, Glenn Hoddle, said afterwards that Rob Styles should not have been appointed as referee because he had sent off Birmingham's Kenny Cunningham in pre-season and "it's human nature to balance things up." Both sides had chances to win the match as James Beattie struck the post and Stern John saw a shot cleared off the line. Birmingham then overcame Newcastle United 1–0 at St James' Park: after Gary Speed brought down Damien Johnson in the penalty area, Dunn's penalty was saved, but he scored from the rebound to give Birmingham a second league win in three games. In the first minute of the match, referee Matt Messias accidentally struck Savage in the face as he signalled a free kick. Their second league win in three games saw Birmingham climb to sixth in the table as they entered September.

Birmingham signed Finland international striker Mikael Forssell on a season-long loan from Chelsea before the transfer window shut. He scored twice on debut in a 2–2 draw with Fulham at St Andrew's, equalising just before half-time after Louis Saha gave the visitors an early lead and then again tying the scores after 82 minutes. Both sides finished with ten men: Sylvain Legwinski received a second yellow card for tripping Dunn and Darren Purse was sent off for "aiming a punch at" Luis Boa Morte after he scored Fulham's second goal. At Elland Road, Leeds United had the upper hand until Roque Júnior fouled Forssell and was sent off. Paul Robinson saved Dunn's penalty but the assistant referee saw an infringement. Savage's retake was successful and Forssell made the score 2–0. A 2–0 win at home to Portsmouth on 27 September with goals from Stephen Clemence and Stan Lazaridis gave Birmingham their best ever start to a league season and moved them fourth in the table.

October–December
Manchester United inflicted Birmingham's first league defeat of the season, winning 3–0 at Old Trafford after goalkeeper Maik Taylor was sent off by Mike Dean for fouling Paul Scholes. A goalless draw was enough to take normally free-scoring Chelsea top of the league and Birmingham fourth. Having lost both Second City derbies in 2002–03, Aston Villa held out for a goalless draw at St Andrew's "in a game high on energy but desperately low on quality". A fine save by Taylor from Bolton Wanderers' Kevin Davies helped Birmingham keep another clean sheet and a well-worked goal by Forssell gave them a fifth win of the season. Faced with criticism of his team's style of play, Bruce was pragmatic: "I wanted to assemble a team that was difficult to beat. If I'd gone down the other route and brought in six flair players we’d have ended up bottom of the League."

Having conceded only five league goals in the first three months of the season, Birmingham's defence was unusually fragile against Charlton Athletic. Matt Holland's two goals and Dean Kiely's multiple saves helped them become the first team for nine months to win at St Andrew's. Christophe Dugarry's powerfully headed goal was his first of the season and the last of his Birmingham career. Forssell scored just after half-time in a 1–1 draw at home to local rivals Wolverhampton Wanderers, before Birmingham lost 3–0 at home to Arsenal. They had the better of the first half against Liverpool at Anfield, but two spectacular second-half goals gave the hosts a 3–1 victory that left Birmingham in eighth place.

Four goals in the last half hour gave Blackburn Rovers an emphatic win at Birmingham. Dugarry, who had earlier missed from a yard out and whose foul in the build-up caused Forssell's goal to be disallowed, was sent off on 72 minutes after receiving two yellow cards. He was later charged with misconduct by the Football Association over an incident missed by the referee in which Craig Short's nose was broken, and banned for three matches. In Dugarry's absence with a knee injury, Clinton Morrison made his first league start for eight months and scored the opening goal in a match in which two opponents were sent off: Leicester City's captain, Matt Elliott, for an arm in Dunn's face in the first half and their goalkeeper, Ian Walker, after an hour for handling the ball a long way outside his penalty area. Forssell's header completed a 2–0 win, and Maik Taylor ended the match with a black eye and three stitches. Manchester City took an early lead at St Andrew's on Boxing Day, and despite pressure from Birmingham it took two fortunate goals in the last ten minutesJeff Kenna headed home the rebound after Savage's free kick struck the goalpost, and Richard Dunne's attempted clearance bounced in off Forssellto secure the three points. Against Everton at Goodison Park, when Taylor was "jostled" by both Duncan Ferguson and Alan Stubbs, no foul was given, and Wayne Rooney scored the only goal of the match; the defeat left Birmingham ninth in the table.

January–February
With a defence disrupted by injurymidfielder Darren Carter, making his first start of the season, was one of three players used at left back in the first 40 minutesBirmingham conceded three times to Tottenham Hotspur in the first half. Savage's penalty reduced the deficit, but Morrison missed a chance when through on goal, and the match ended 4–1. A goal apiece after 16 minutes, Antti Niemi's goalkeeping kept Southampton in the game, but Kenna scored the winner after an exchange of passes with Morrison; it was his second goal in two weeks and third in  years. Moments later, Kenna was having his head stitched after a challenge for which David Prutton was sent off. At Stamford Bridge, PA Sport's reporter highlighted Birmingham's incredible tenacity, Savage and Clemence "excelling in central midfield as they outplayed, let alone outfought, their far more illustrious opponents" to record another goalless draw with Chelsea, helped by Olivier Tebily's acrobatic clearance off the line after a rare error by Maik Taylor. After Newcastle United took a first-half lead at St Andrew's, Birmingham dominated without success. They were awarded a free kick in the second minute of stoppage time, which was moved forward 10 yards after a Newcastle player kicked the ball away. Cunningham took the free kick, and Stern John slid in to score.

Taylor made several fine saves, including a "superlative double reflex save from first Macken and then Sibierski", in a goalless draw with Manchester City at Eastlands. Johnson had and missed a late chance to win the match for Birmingham, which even Bruce thought would have been a injustice. Three days later Birmingham comfortably beat Everton with goals by Johnson, Forssell and Stan Lazaridis: "after collecting a pass from Savage in his own half, the Australian embarked on a speedy, purposeful and unchecked  run before unleashing a fierce cross-shot into the roof of the net" that earned him the club's Goal of the Season award. Birmingham came back from 2–0 down at Villa Park to draw the Second City derby; the equaliser came in the fourth minute of stoppage time when Morrison's shot was parried and Stern John "thrashed the loose ball into the roof of the net". It was Christophe Dugarry's final appearance before his contract was cancelled by mutual consent.

March–May
Home wins against Middlesbrough, League Cup winners just three days before, in which recent signing Martin Taylor scored his first goal when Forssell's shot struck his shoulder, and League Cup losers Bolton Wanderers, in which Bryan Hughes's first goal of the season and Forssell's fourth in four games took Birmingham fifth in the table. Leicester City prepared for their visit to Birmingham with a "bonding" break in Spain during which nine players were arrested, three of whom were jailed; thanks to Les Ferdinand's goal and their hosts' poor finishing, they put an end to Birmingham's eight-match unbeaten run. The away match with Middlesbrough, played in a howling gale, was described by the Independent as "an eight-goal thriller in which a keeper (Middlesbrough's Mark Schwarzer) was the star and managed to keep the scoring within reasonable bounds" and by the Guardian as "a snatch of comic relief, a red-face day out of the blue"; Birmingham lost 5–3, and the last goal was scored by Szilard Nemeth after Matthew Upson tried to head the ball back to his goalkeeper but could not reach it until he was almost flat on the floor. Birmingham conceded early at home to Leeds United but had a 3–1 lead when a penalty was awarded. Although Forssell was the designated penalty-taker, Hughes had two goals already and wanted to complete his hat-trick; Bruce intervened in favour of Forssell, who duly scored his 18th goal of the season.

Two weeks after Maik Taylor's loan from Fulham was made permanent, his goalkeeping was instrumental in Birmingham's goalless draw with his former club; the result left them in sixth place. Martin Grainger, who had replaced the injured Lazaridis after 14 minutes, opened the scoring against Manchester United after 39 with a free kick. He was himself substituted at half-time because of a patellar tendon torn before he took the free kick, and he never played again. Cristiano Ronaldo and Louis Saha gave United a 2–1 win. Just before half-time at Portsmouth, Yakubu Aiyegbeni gave the hosts the lead. Referee Barry Knight disallowed the goal, sent off Maik Taylor for handling the ball outside his area, and awarded a free kick, from which Dejan Stefanović scored. Portsmouth doubled their lead, and then Stern John made the score 2–1. Knight then awarded a penalty, converted by Yakubu, and disallowed John's second for offsideharshly, according to BBC Sport. Morrison gave Birmingham the lead at Charlton, who promptly equalised; Hughes miskicked in front of an open goal in stoppage time. Away to Wolverhampton Wanderers, Forssell scored his 19th and last goal of the season and played a through ball from which Morrison gave Birmingham a 2–1 lead, but Taylor parried the ball to Carl Cort's feet for the equaliser.

Without Maik Taylor and Forssell, Birmingham secured a goalless draw away to a strong Arsenal side already confirmed as league champions. Had Morrison not failed to control Lazaridis' second-half cross, their unbeaten record might well have been broken. In their last home game of the season, Birmingham lost 3–0 to Liverpool; Emile Heskey, who made the assist for Michael Owen's goal and scored the second, signed for Birmingham ten days later. With Cunningham suspended, Savage captained the team for the visit to Blackburn Rovers; Stern John's late equaliser secured a 1–1 draw away and a tenth-place finish, six points short of European qualification.

Match details

League table

Results summary

FA Cup

Birmingham reached the fifth round of the 2003–04 FA Cup before losing to Sunderland of Division One after a replay.

League Cup

Birmingham entered the 2003–04 League Cup at the second round. They conceded after six minutes away to Blackpool of the Second Division, and when given a chance from the penalty spot, Clemence's kick cleared the bar.

Transfers

In

Out

 Brackets round club names denote the player joined that club after his Birmingham City contract expired.

Loan in

Loan out

Appearances and goals

Numbers in parentheses denote appearances as substitute.
Players with squad numbers struck through and marked  left the club during the playing season.
Players with names in italics and marked * were on loan from another club for the whole of their season with Birmingham.

Sources

References

External links
 Match reports from the Birmingham City F.C. website
 Match reports from the Sporting Life website

Birmingham City F.C. seasons
Birmingham City